Andrés Torres Queiruga (born 1940 in Aguiño, Ribeira, Galicia) is a Galician theologian, writer and translator.

Biography
He studied in Santiago de Compostela and Comillas Pontifical University. He is a doctor in Theology and Philosophy.

He lectures Theology at the Instituto Teolóxico compostelá and philosophy of religion at the University of Santiago de Compostela. A member of the Real Academia Galega and the Consello da Cultura Galega, he was a founder of the magazine Encrucillada: Revista Galega de Pensamento Cristián, nowadays he is director of the Asociación Encrucillada. He is a staff member of the magazines Iglesia Viva, Sal Terrae, Revista Portuguesa de Filosofía and Concilium.

Works
Some of his most important works are:

 Teoloxía e sociedade, Vigo, 1974
 Constitución y evolución del dogma: la teoría de Amor Ruibal y su aportación, Madrid, 1977
 Recupera-la salvación, Vigo, 1977
 Nova aproximación a unha filosofía da saudade, Vigo, 1981
 A revelación como maieútica histórica, Vigo, 1984
 Rolda de ideas, 1984
 A revelación de Deus na realización do home, Vigo, 1985
 Creo en Deus Pai. O Deus de Xesús e a autonomía humana, Vigo, 1986
 Noción, religación, trascendencia. O coñecemento de Deus en Amor Ruibal e Xavier Zubiri, A Coruña, 1990
 Recupera-la creación. Por unha relixión humanizadora, Vigo, 1996
 Fin del cristianismo premoderno. Retos hacia un nuevo horizonte, Santander, 2000
 Repensar a resurrección. A diferencia cristiá na continuidade das relixións e da cultura, Vigo, 2002
 Para unha filosofía da saudade, Ourense, 2003
 signator of the Church 2011 manifesto

References

1940 births
People from O Barbanza
Spanish Christian theologians
Liberation theologians
Galician translators
Translators to Galician
Writers from Galicia (Spain)
Galician-language writers
Living people